Kuusankoski is a neighbourhood of city of Kouvola, former industrial town and municipality of Finland, located in the region of Kymenlaakso in the province of Southern Finland. The population of Kuusankoski was 20,392 (2003) and the total area was 129.5 km² of which 114 km² was land and 14.56 km² water. Kuusankoski is primarily known for paper manufacturing and three large factory complexes. It is sometimes nicknamed the "Paper capital of Finland".

History 

Kuusankoski (as a municipality, not the settlement), was founded in 1921 from the parts of neighbouring Iitti and Valkeala. It gained the status of kauppala (literally "a place of commerce") in 1957 and became a town in 1973.

The history of Kuusankoski during the last one and a half centuries has been closely linked to the establishment of the paper factories and their development. The establishment of the factories dates back to the 1870s and 1890s, when the rapids of the river Kymijoki were made to deliver electricity to a waking industry. Since then, and until the modern age of automation, the factories have offered jobs to many generations of Kuusankoski citizens, making the area somewhat more prosperous than the neighbouring regions. Today, the influence of the factories on everyday life has somewhat lessened, but their historical importance remains well known.

The cityscape of Kuusankoski consists mostly of element-based blocks of flats built during the 1960s. However, there are some exceptions, such as a school and a church built at the beginning of the last century. Another kind of architecture is represented by the culture building Kuusankoskitalo, a typical creation of modern Finnish architecture, and a library built in a functionalistic style. The cityscape is also characterised by the river Kymijoki which curves through the town.

Footballer Sami Hyypiä is from Kuusankoski. Ex-Nightwish singer Tarja Turunen also lives in the town.

As of 2009, the six municipalities – Kouvola, Kuusankoski, Elimäki, Anjalankoski, Valkeala and Jaala – were consolidated, accounting for the new municipality of Kouvola with a population of over 80,000, being the 10th largest city in Finland.

Hydropower

People born in Kuusankoski
Kalevi Laitinen (1919 – 1995)
Eeva-Kaarina Volanen (1921 – 1999)
Veikko Kansikas (1923 – 1991)
Erkki Kataja (1924 – 1969)
Aulis Kallakorpi (1929 – 2005)
Kaj Chydenius (1939 – )
Maija-Liisa Peuhu (1942 – )
Esa Jokinen (1958 – )
Janne Lindberg (1966 – )
Jukka Heinikainen (1972 – )
Jani Uotinen (1978 – )
Jukka Rajala (1982 – )
Sami Hyypia (1973 - )
Jani Sutelainen (1985 - )

References

External links

Kuusankoski – Suomen paperikaupunki (in Finnish)

Populated places established in 1921
Populated places disestablished in 2009
2009 disestablishments in Finland
Former municipalities of Finland
Kouvola